Chester "Chet" Andrew Orr (December 6, 1882 – October 10, 1950) was an American football player and industrialist.

Early life
Chester Orr was born in Syracuse, New York on December 6, 1882.  He graduated high school in Willoughby, Ohio in 1901.  For college, he attended Case School of Applied Science, known today as Case Western Reserve University, graduating in 1905.  He was a founding member of the Ohio Epsilon chapter of Phi Kappa Psi.

Football career

Orr played on and captained several Case Tech football teams, who were considered the best college football teams in the state of Ohio.  He played quarterback, punter, kicker, punt returner, and kick returner on teams who defeated the Ohio State Buckeyes twice, and who won the Ohio Athletic Conference in its first three seasons of existence –1902, 1903, and 1904.  Case Tech went undefeated against rival Western Reserve all three seasons.

Later life
Orr worked for numerous companies until joining the Union Metal Manufacturing Company  of Canton, Ohio in 1925.  He held various positions such as a director for the Canton Museum of Art, director of the Canton Chamber of Commerce, and trustee of Aultman Hospital.

Chester Orr ended his career as president and chairman of the board of Union Metal Manufacturing Company Orr, passing away on October 10, 1950 of a cerebral hemorrhage.  Orr is buried at Forest Hill Cemetery in Canton, Ohio.

References

External links
 

1882 births
1950 deaths
American football quarterbacks
Case Western Spartans football players
Players of American football from Ohio